Doris Yaa Korantenmaa Dartey (died 19 July 2020) was a Ghanaian communication educator, consultant and onetime member and chairperson of GJA Awards Committee. She was the former chairperson of the Graphic Communications Group Limited in Ghana.

Education 
Dartey studied at the University of Cape Coast, where she graduated with BA in education. She also obtained a graduate diploma in journalism and mass communication from the School of Communication Studies at University of Ghana, and an MA in international affairs (development communication), a graduate diploma in women's studies and a PhD in organizational communication from Ohio University in the US.

Career 
She was a communication consultant and worked for donor-funded projects such as African Union Commission, African Development Bank, UNESCO, GIZ, among others.

She also served as a member on the National Media Commission before she became a chairperson of the board of directors of GCGL. She taught communication courses in the USA and Ghana at the University of Dayton, Mount Mercy University, GIMPA, and GIJ.

She was a journalist and hosted some programs in Ghana for some years. She also wrote a column in The Spectator newspaper in Ghana called The WatchWoman which talked about environmental issues, sanitation, health, children and other societal issues. She was a mentor of many journalists, communicators and public relations practitioners in Ghana.

Personal life 
She had two daughters.

Death 
She died at KBTH in Accra on Sunday, 19 July 2020 after succumbing to complications of breast cancer. She was laid to rest at the Lashibi Funeral Home, a place near Tema.

References 

Ghanaian journalists
Ghanaian women journalists
2020 deaths
Year of birth missing
Place of birth missing
University of Cape Coast alumni
Ghanaian educators
University of Ghana alumni
Ohio University alumni
20th-century Ghanaian educators
20th-century Ghanaian women
20th-century Ghanaian people